The Brier Icefalls are icefalls about  high and  wide at the east side of Vantage Hill in the Britannia Range. They were named after Frank Brier of the Office of Polar Programs, National Science Foundation, who was Facilities, Engineering and Construction Program Manager for renovation of facilities at McMurdo Station and for South Pole Station Modernization, 1995–2001.

Further reading 
 Jane G. Ferrigno, Kevin M. Foley, Charles Swithinbank, and Richard S. Williams, Jr., Coastal-Change and Glaciological Map of the Ross Island Area, Antarctica: 1962–2005, U.S. Geological Survey Professional Paper

References 

Icefalls of Oates Land